Hacı Topal Osman Ağa (1883 – 2 April 1923) was a Turkish officer, a militia leader of the National Forces, a volunteer regiment commander of the Turkish army during the Turkish War of Independence who eventually rose to the rank of lieutenant colonel, and was a perpetrator of the Armenian and Pontic genocides.

He was the commander of Mustafa Kemal's special Bodyguard Regiment. He showed usefulness in the War of Independence, but in 1923, when it was decided that he was the instigator of Trabzon Deputy 's murder, he was detained. He was captured and injured during the clashes, but he was killed by İsmail Hakkı Tekçe.

Early life and Balkan Wars
He was born in Giresun in 1883 and was of Turkish origin, more particularly the Chepni tribe. His father, Feridûnzâde Hacı Mehmet Efendi, was a hazelnut merchant. In his youth he helped with the family business and became a partner in a sawmill. He married and had two sons. Despite his father paying his military service price, he refused to stay and joined the 1912–1913 Balkan Wars with his 65 friends. They fought in Çorlu. A Bulgarian cannonball wounded his right kneecap during the war. He refused to have his leg amputated, so the doctors only took out the shrapnel from his knee without anesthesia, causing him to become lame.

World War I
While still limping, Osman Ağa joined World War I with 93 friends, later joined by 6 prisoners in Trabzon. They charged the Russian army, causing many casualties for the Russians but also the death of 6 friends of Osman Ağa. During the war, he caught typhoid, leading to him returning to Giresun. After recovering, he returned to the war. He joined the 37th Division in Bayburt, which eventually retreated to Harşit. The Russians couldn't go any further. Osman Ağa returned to Giresun to recruit more soldiers and went back to fight with 1500 young volunteers. After the October Revolution took place, the Russians withdrew from the battle, leading the Turks to reconquer Batum. Osman Ağa's battalion was the first one to enter Batum.

Armenian and Greek genocides
Topal Osman was known to have been responsible for massacres against Armenians and Greeks during the Ottoman civil war in the Pontus region where he was stationed during World War I. While in Trabzon, Osman made a name for himself in the spring of 1915 as commander of a squadron of gangs. Osman, along with Ishak Çavuş and Bayıroğlu Hüseyin, was known to have partaken in the drowning and massacres of the local Armenian population. During this time, Osman had also profited from the confiscation of assets and property belonging to the Armenians.

In 1916, Osman and a band of men attacked a Pontian Greek farming village, named Prossori, in Trebizond Vilayet. The men raped village women, killed young men, stole what they wanted from the houses, and beat a priest to death. On threat of death, the surviving villagers had to sign a document saying that the attackers were Armenian. 

Osman made similar attacks on Pontian Greeks after the war. In 1920, he and his men imprisoned all the Christian men of Giresun and held them for ransom. They raped the Christian women while their husbands and fathers were imprisoned. Every evening, Osman's team killed five or six prisoners. 

In Çarşamba in 1921, Turks rounded up the Christian women. The majority were sent on a death march, while a selected minority of "good-looking women...were being held for the pleasure of the troops under Osman Ağa," according to an American observer serving aboard the USS Overton. Such attacks by Osman and his men were overt and frequent. An American serving aboard the USS Williamson spoke to a local man, who said that "what had happened made him ashamed to be a Turk." In Merzifon that same year, Osman and his men broke into Christians' houses at night, raping, killing, or kidnapping the inhabitants. They also stole what they wanted from the townspeople. Many Christians took shelter in the local French school; Osman's brigands abducted and raped the women and girls, killed the men and boys, and later burned the school. Osman's band abducted many women and girls as they left the town. Some Turkish townspeople took part in the attacks, while those sympathetic to their Christian neighbors found themselves unable to stop the slaughter. Osman later traveled to Trebizond and began robbing houses, but was driven off by a Turkish gangster called Yahya. 

Again in 1921, Topal Osman and his men traveled to Giresun and nearby Tirebolu. The same pattern repeated: They killed or deported the majority of local Pontian Greeks, but selected some women and girls for the troops' use. 

In 1922, Osman led his men to Ordu. Few Christian men remained, but many women and children did. Osman and his men picked the women and girls they wanted from the crowd. They forced all the other Christians into two buildings, which they set on fire. Osman and his men raped the selected women throughout the  night, then "butchered" them the next day. Osman's men did the same in nine nearby villages.

His activities against the Greeks were so brutal that even Adnan Bey sent a letter to the government in Ankara asking to take measures against Topal Osman.

Turkish War of Independence

As the mayor of Giresun
After the First World War, Topal Osman Ağa continued his operations in the Black Sea region, this time targeting rebellious Christian Pontic Greeks during the Turkish War of Independence.

Osman Ağa declared himself mayor of Giresun in order to fight the Pontic paramilitary forces more easily. He wasn't prevented by anybody, as he was believed to be the only one who could protect Turks against these bands.

An Association for Defence of National Rights was formed in Giresun. On 27 May 1919, a death sentence issued for Topal Osman by the Ottoman government. He escaped for a while. While Osman Ağa was escaping, he ordered a meeting to be arranged in Giresun to protest the Occupation of İzmir. He met Mustafa Kemal in Havza. Mustafa Kemal ordered Osman Ağa to fight Pontic bands no matter what the Ottoman government orders. The death sentence abolished on 8 July 1919.

Osman Ağa's first notable act was tearing apart and walking over the Pontic flag raised by Pontic bands while he was escaping from Ottoman government. He executed the Greek man who raised the Pontic flag, as well as one of his collaborators. He continued his acts by raiding the Greek cinema for insulting Turks inside, attacking Mavridi Mansion to destroy the "Haçika gang", preventing Pontic irregulars coming from various places, including Batum and Ukraine, from entering Giresun. He made Coast Guards more organized to prevent other Pontics to enter. 

An assassination attempt against him was plotted by pro-Ottoman governor Badi Nedim, but Osman Ağa learned about this plan and had him out from Giresun. Badi Nedim was dismissed on 6 October.

Osman Ağa's activities included preventing the citizens from throwing away trash to keep the city clean, forbidding alcohol and prostitution, founding a worker's quarry to help orphans, building better roads and bringing electricity to some parts of the city. He was quite harsh towards prostitutes. He cut their hair off and forced them to leave Giresun. Those who couldn't would drown in the sea. 

In January 1920, Osman Ağa started publishing the newspaper Gedikkaya.

In February 1920, six British battle ships came close to Giresun, but prevented by Osman Ağa from landing. British commander invited him to ship to meet, but Osman Ağa understood that it was a trap and didn't go. British ships went off after a British soldier attacking a girl and getting wounded by his foot.
 
In March 1920, Osman Ağa captured a powerboat coming from Greece and took everything inside; which was 1800 Turkish liras, 700 Russian silvers, 600 American dollars and 400 jerry cans. All of these were sent to Association for Defence of National Rights. The powerboat was used during the Turkish War of Independence. He later executed a pro-Pontic agency clerk named Yorgi as well as two Greek doctors who malpracticed Turkish patients. He arranged a meeting and after the meeting; he, along with the people who joined the meeting, forced the Greek metropolitan to pray for Turks. Later, a postman named Atmacidi was also executed for spreading Greek propaganda.

He took part of shipping weapons from Soviet Union and sending these to the Western Front. He sold hazelnut and wine to Soviets and bought weapons from them.

He received an order to go to Amasra due to the ongoing revolt in Düzce. However, his contribution to the suppression of the rebellion is unknown.

He sent a battalion, consisting of 1050 men from Ordu, Giresun, Görele, Tirebolu and Akçaabat, to Eastern Front but the battalion joined at the end of the fight. Nevertheless, the battalion stayed there for 4 months, ultimately to return to their home in January 1921.

According to non-Turkish reporters and historians, he was cruel towards Greek civilians as well. According to Mustafa Kemal's recent biographer Robert Shenk of the US Naval Institute, Topal Osman was a sadistic ethnic cleanser of Armenians and Greeks." Osman along with his militia forces, were responsible for massacres, deportations, destruction and confiscation of property, extortion, rapes and other atrocities throughout this region including the cities, towns and villages of  Samsun, Marsovan, Giresun, Tirebolu, Ünye, Havza and Bulancak. He was however refused arms and cooperation by the government and inhabitants of Trabzon. According to Bruce Clark, it was because in Trabzon multicultural pro-Ottoman ideals were stronger due to inter-ethnic and religious family ties. According to Turkish historians, it was because of the tension between Osman Ağa, who wasn't obeying Trabzon and was taking orders only and directly from Mustafa Kemal, and the Trabzon governors, many of whom were pro-Ottoman who (as well as some others appointed from the GNA) believed Osman Ağa's activities would cause the Allies to occupy the Black Sea region. Together with his (alleged) subsequent murder of Trabzon deputy Ali Şükrü Bey (leader of the first Turkish opposition group in the GNA) this led to long standing animosity between the nationalist government of Mustafa Kemal and the population of Trabzon.

Foreign correspondents accused him as the principal organizer of the persecution against the Greeks at the Pontus region and also that he made a great fortune from the plundering of the churches.

Guard platoon of Mustafa Kemal 

Since there were no forces to protect the Grand National Assembly in Ankara, Ali Şükrü suggested formation of a guard platoon, which was accepted. Mustafa Kemal invited Topal Osman to Ankara. While in road, Osman Ağa destroyed a Greek band in Gerze and made another flee in İnebolu. Mustafa Kemal took 10 men from Osman Ağa to protect him. These guards prevented two assassinations against Mustafa Kemal, both carried by Çerkez Ethem. The guards were replaced by 20 new guards. Çerkez Ethem attempted a third assassination, which was prevented by these guards as well as Osman Ağa himself. Osman Ağa planned to kill Ethem later but was stopped by Kılıç Ali, who said to Osman Ağa that Mustafa Kemal wouldn't like it. Later, he met with and helped İpsiz Recep, another militia leader in the Black Sea region, mainly active in Rize. Another guard unit of 100 men were sent to Mustafa Kemal by Topal Osman.

42nd and 47th Giresun Volunteers Regiments 

Topal Osman, upon the order he received from Ankara, left the command of the guard unit to Gümüşreisoğlu Mustafa Kaptan in 1921 and went to Giresun. He formed two regiments consisting of volunteers. Volunteers also took part in the suppression of the Koçgiri Rebellion in March–April 1921. During the rebellion, the regiment commanded by Osman Ağa was named 47th Regiment and the other regiment, commanded by Hüseyin Avni Alparslan, was named 42nd Regiment.

He commanded the 47th Regiment during the Battle of the Sakarya. On his way, Osman Ağa and his regiment fought with Greek bands in Erbaa, Çakallı and Bafra. Osman Ağa's regiment was ambushed by Pontic bands in Havza and Merzifon, but ultimately destroyed by the regiment. During the war, almost all of the 42nd Regiment, consisting of 2000 people, lost their lives, including the commander Hüseyin Avni Alparslan. About 80–90 soldiers survived from the 42nd Regiment, who merged with 58th Regiment. 47th Regiment was ordered to capture a hill the army couldn't, but they didn't even have bayonets since they wore their traditional clothes. 47th Regiment attacked with their knives and succeeded to throw back Greeks, but sixty percent of them died. Of the dead from both regiments, 234 were managed to be identified. After the victory, Osman Ağa rose to the rank of lieutenant colonel and was honored with the Medal of Independence.

On 8 June 1922, by the Orders of National Taxes, Osman Ağa attempted to sell all his real estate to fund the army, but was prevented by the wealthy people of Giresun who said he "served enough" by joining fight and all he has done.

Topal Osman joined the Great Offensive as the commander of the 47th Regiment, which was reinforced after the Battle of Sakarya. His forces captured a front, which Greeks claimed Turks couldn't capture even in 7 years, in 2 days. At least 14 soldiers died from the 47th Regiment. His forces entered Manisa, Turgutlu, Akhisar, Kırkağaç, Soma, Ayvalık and Edremit respectively. In Ayvalık, all Greek men between age 15–45 were sent as Amele Taburları to İvrindi. Almost all of them ending up dying. 47th Regiment later went to Balıkesir, where Osman Ağa, with help of local civilians, executed Greek bands for tormenting Turks there, no matter their age, as well as raping young girls. 47th Regiment eventually returned to Salihli. Osman Ağa stayed in Istanbul for a while, where a failed assassination attempt committed against him. On his way to Giresun, he burned 3 Pontic rebels to death. He was greeted with great enthusiasm in his hometown Giresun, when he returned on 21 December 1922.

According to some sources, Topal Osman (while other sources claim that this words belong to Nurettin Pasha) said:

Later life and death
Osman Ağa was invited to Rize to the opening of a secondary school. After the opening is over and he returned to Giresun, he went to Ankara after he got a telegram. Osman got the information by Mustafa Kaptan that in the Grand National Assembly, there were heated discussions about the Lausanne Conference and Ali Şükrü was opposing Mustafa Kemal. Osman Ağa said he will talk to Ali Şükrü and persuade him to give up his opposition.

Murder of Ali Şükrü Bey 

He was held responsible for the murder of deputy , who suddenly disappeared on 27 March 1923 in Ankara. After the body was found in the vicinity of Mühye village on the Çankaya ridges on 1 April, an arrest warrant was issued for him. Mustafa Kaptan took Ali Şükrü from Kuyulu Kahve to Osman Ağa's house. Rauf Orbay, in his memoirs, claimed that Mustafa Kaptan confessed Ali Şükrü was murdered in Osman Ağa's house. However, during the trial, Kaptan said he knows nothing about the murder. A witness claimed she heard sounds of begging and screaming. Osman Ağa said to her that his two men were drunk and he punished them by beating. Kaptan and other guards from Giresun were released since there wasn't enough evidence.

Many have claimed that Topal Osman's men killed Ali Şükrü. The government also concluded that it was him. However, historian Ümit Doğan argues that it is not possible, because the murder is too amateur for him, and also because of the close friendship between Osman and Ali Şükrü grown during and after Battle of Sakarya. Doğan also claims that İsmail Hakkı Tekçe possibly killed him and left it on Topal Osman, as he did before in the murder of Yahya Kahya, which was stayed on Topal Osman until Tekçe's confession close to his death. Ali Şükrü's son Nuha Doruker as well claimed that it wasn't Topal Osman who killed his father.

Death

Topal Osman and his men, who were trapped in his house in Priest's Bound on the night of 1 April 1923, by the newly formed guard unit, clashed all night. Topal Osman was captured wounded. Later that day, under İsmail Hakkı's orders, he was executed by a shot to the head. Some claimed İsmail Hakkı cut Osman's head off but this is not true, as on the newspaper Tevhid-i Efkâr, 4 April 1923, it was written that Osman's head was leaned to back.

On 2 April, at the insistence of the "Second Group", his body was dug up and hung at the gate of the parliament building (today War of Independence Museum) for exhibition to the public. According to some sources, his decapitated corpse was hung in the Ulus Square. His body was buried on the top of Giresun Castle by the order of Atatürk in 1925, where he still rests.

Legacy 
Toktamış Ateş of Istanbul University claims that former Prime Minister Tansu Çiller had once promised to open a university in Topal's name.

A statue of him was erected in his home town of Giresun in 2007.

Notes

References

External links
Feridunoğlu Osman Agha (1883–1923)

1883 births
1923 deaths
People from Giresun
People from Trebizond vilayet
Ottoman military personnel of the Balkan Wars
Ottoman people of World War I
Armenian genocide perpetrators
Turkish militia officers
Turkish military personnel of the Turkish War of Independence
Members of Kuva-yi Milliye
Greek genocide perpetrators
Deaths by firearm in Turkey